Mugron is a commune in the Landes department in Nouvelle-Aquitaine in southwestern France.

Population

Personalities
Frédéric Bastiat lived most of his life at Mugron.

See also
Communes of the Landes department

References

Communes of Landes (department)